Max Cohen (23 April 1932 – 21 December 2002) was a French racing cyclist. He rode in the 1955 Tour de France.

References

External links
 

1932 births
2002 deaths
French male cyclists
Sportspeople from Clermont-Ferrand
Cyclists from Auvergne-Rhône-Alpes